OZ Minerals is a mining company based in Adelaide, South Australia.

History
OZ Minerals was formed on 1 July 2008 when Oxiana and Zinifex merged.

In February 2009 a takeover offer by China Minmetals was recommenced for acceptance by Oz Mineral's board of directors. The proposal was one of three high-profile moves by Chinese firms to acquire stakes in the Australian mineral sector in early 2009. The China Minmetals offer along with other proposed purchases, especially the stake in Rio Tinto planned by Chinalco, caused great public furore, adding political pressure to block Minmetals. In March 2009 the Government of Australia blocked the sale, citing national security concerns about the proximity of the Prominent Hill Mine to the RAAF Woomera Range Complex. A revised deal that excluded Prominent Hill was approved in April 2009.

In June 2009 China Minmetals' Australian assets were spun off to form MMG. The Martabe gold project in Indonesia was sold to China Sci-Tech Holdings in the same month.

In 2015, with its activities concentrated on the Prominent Hill mine and the nearby Carapateena prospect in South Australia, OZ Minerals moved its headquarters from Melbourne to Adelaide. in 2016, OZ Minerals commenced construction of its Carapateena mine.

In August 2022 BHP submitted a non-binding indicative proposal to purchase Oz Minerals. The offer was rejected.

Operations

Current
Antas mine, Parauapebas, Brazil
Carrapateena mine
Prominent Hill Mine

Former
Century Mine
Golden Grove Mine
Martabe mine

References

External links
Official website

Mining companies of Australia
Copper mining companies of Australia
Gold mining companies of Australia
Mining in South Australia
Companies listed on the Australian Securities Exchange
Australian companies established in 2008
Companies based in Adelaide